The 1950 Oregon State Beavers football team represented Oregon State College in the Pacific Coast Conference (PCC) during the 1950 college football season.  In their second season under head coach Kip Taylor, the Beavers compiled a 3–6 record (2–5 in PCC, eighth), and were outscored  183 to 114.  The team played two home games on campus at Bell Field in Corvallis and four at Multnomah Stadium in Portland.

Schedule

Coaching staff
  Bump Elliott, backs
 Pete Elliott, ends
 Len Younce, line
 Hal Moe, freshmen

Season summary

Oregon
Bob Cornelison 23 Rush, 122 Yds

References

External links
 Game program: Oregon State at Washington State – November 18, 1950

Oregon State
Oregon State Beavers football seasons
Oregon State Beavers football